Dobroniega is a Slavic name which contains word "dobro" - good, goodness and "niega" - delight, and may refer to:
 Dobroniega of Poland - a Polish princess member of the House of Piast and by marriage Margravine of Lusatia.
 Maria Dobroniega of Kiev - a Slavic princess member of the Rurikid dynasty

See also

 Polish name
 Slavic names

Given names

Slavic feminine given names
Czech feminine given names
Polish feminine given names
Slovene feminine given names